Mohammadabad (also Romanized as Moḩammadābād) is a village in Jushaq Rural District, in the Central District of Delijan County, Markazi Province, Iran. At the 2006 census, its population was 5, in 5 families.

References 

Populated places in Delijan County